The Maputo conger (Bathymyrus smithi) is an eel in the family Congridae (conger/garden eels). It was described by Peter Henry John Castle in 1968. It is a marine, deep water-dwelling eel which also inhabits brackish waters, and is known from the Limpopo River and the Indian Ocean. It is known to dwell at a depth range of 470–490 metres. Males can reach a maximum total length of 58 centimetres.

References

Congridae
Fish described in 1968